KBHW (99.5 FM, "Psalm FM") is a radio station broadcasting a Christian radio format. Licensed to International Falls, Minnesota, United States, the station is currently owned by Heartland Christian Broadcasters, Inc.

History
The Federal Communications Commission issued a construction permit for the station to Minnesota Christian Broadcasters Inc. on June 30, 1982. The station was issued the KBHW call sign on August 16, 1982, and received its license to cover on November 30, 1983. On July 23, 1999, Minnesota Christian assigned the license to the current owners, Heartland Christian Broadcasters, Inc.

Translators
In addition to the main station, KBHW is relayed by an additional 11 translators to widen its broadcast area.

References

External links

Christian radio stations in Minnesota
Moody Radio affiliate stations
Radio stations established in 1982
1982 establishments in Minnesota
International Falls, Minnesota